Psidopala roseola is a moth in the family Drepanidae. It was described by Werny in 1966. It is found in Shaanxi, China.

References

Moths described in 1966
Thyatirinae
Moths of Asia